The Oklahoma City Stars are the athletic teams that represent Oklahoma City University, located in Oklahoma City, in the U.S. state of Oklahoma, in intercollegiate sports as a member of the National Association of Intercollegiate Athletics (NAIA), primarily competing in the Sooner Athletic Conference (SAC) for most of its sports since the 1986–87 academic year. The Stars previously competed at the NCAA Division I ranks, primarily competing in the Midwestern City Conference (MCC; now known as the Horizon League) from 1979–80 to 1984–85; in the D-I Trans America Athletic Conference (TAAC; now known as the Atlantic Sun Conference) during the 1978–79 school year, and as a Division I independent prior to that. Its women's wrestling team competed in the Women's College Wrestling Association (WCWA).

Varsity teams
OCU competes in 18 intercollegiate varsity sports: Men's sports include baseball, basketball, cross country, golf, soccer, track & field and wrestling; while women's sports include basketball, cross country, golf, soccer, softball, stunt, track & field and volleyball; and co-ed sports include competitive cheer, competitive dance and rowing. Former sports included women's wrestling.

Men's basketball

Oklahoma City University has won 6 NAIA National Championships: 1991, 1992, 1994, 1996, 2007, and 2008.

Oklahoma City University has made 18 NAIA tournament appearances: 1987, 1991, 1992, 1993, 1994, 1995, 1996, 1998, 1999, 2000, 2001, 2002, 2003, 2004, 2005, 2006, 2007, 2008, 2010.

As a member of the NCAA, Oklahoma City University went to the NCAA tournament 11 times, the most of any school no longer a member of the NCAA (1952, 1953, 1954, 1955, 1956, 1957, 1963, 1964, 1965, 1966, and 1973.)

Oklahoma City University appeared in the NIT twice, in 1959 and 1968.

Baseball
Oklahoma City has had 71 Major League Baseball Draft selections since the draft began in 1965.

Spirit squads
OCU fields a pom squad, a cheerleading squad, and a STUNT (sport) team

OCU has won the NCA/NAIA National Invitational/Championships in the following years:

NCA:
All-Girl NAIA:
2012, 2013
Small Coed NAIA:
2014, 2015, 2016
Large Coed NAIA:
2011, 2012, 2013, 2014

NAIA:
Competitive Cheer Invitational:
2014
NAIA Competitive Cheer National Championship:
2017, 2021

OCU has won the National Dance Alliance Championships in the following divisions:

NDA NAIA Large: 2011, 2013

NDA NAIA Small: 2016

NDA Division III Hip Hop: 2016

OCU Dance won the NAIA Invitational in 2014

National championships
In 2012, Kevin Patrick Hardy (class of 2013) became OCU's first national champion in wrestling, taking the national title at 165 pounds. Hardy was a Division 1 three time state champion at Solon High School in Ohio.

Through the Spring 2012 sports season, Oklahoma City has won 49 national championships. Of these, 45 are NAIA championships, and four are WCWA championships.

Oklahoma City won the NACDA Director's Cup for the NAIA in 2002 and 2017, awarded annually to the college or university with the most success in collegiate athletics.

OCU has won national championships in the following sports (number of championships in parentheses, NAIA titles unless otherwise specified):
 Men's
 Baseball (1) – 2005
 Basketball (6) – 1991, 1992, 1994, 1996, 2007, 2008
 Golf (10) – 2001, 2002, 2003, 2004, 2006, 2007, 2010, 2012, 2013, 2016
 Tennis (4) – 1998, 1999, 2000, 2001

Total men's Championships:  21  (in 4 different men's team sports)
 Women's
 Basketball (8) – 1988, 1999, 2000, 2001, 2002, 2012, 2014, 2015
 Golf (7) – 2005, 2006, 2007, 2008, 2009, 2013, 2014
 Softball (11) – 1994, 1995, 1996, 1997, 2000, 2001, 2002, 2007, 2016, 2017, 2022
 Wrestling (4-WCWA) – 2009, 2010, 2011, 2012

Total women's championships:  27  (in 4 different women's team sports)

 Co-ed
 Cheerleading (2) – 2017, 2021 

Total coed championships:  1  (in 1 coed team sport)

Football

Oklahoma City's football program and head coach Os Doenges made multiple innovative attempts to improving the game.

The first and most successful innovation was credited to opposing coach Dike Beede when the football team played in the 1941 Oklahoma City vs. Youngstown football game.  This game marks the first American football game to use a penalty flag.

The second innovation was an unsuccessful venture to allow a coach to be on the field with the offense to help call plays and provide additional coaching as time allows. Doenges proposed tests with opposing coaches and at least two agreed to test the idea. However, the concept itself was considered a success and rules changes eventually allowed coaches on the sidelines to call plays and send plays in with a substitute.

Also, Doenges is credited with inventing the offensive V formation while at Oklahoma City.  Nicknamed "Three dots and a dash" (Morse code for the letter "v"), the program presented the new offensive formation to great fanfare before losing to the Southwestern Moundbuilders by a score of 7–0.

The team played Toledo in the 1948 Glass Bowl, losing 27–14.

Nickname and mascot history
The school is currently known as the Stars, but was known as the Goldbugs or Gold Bugs in the 1920s, 30s and early 40s. From 1944, the university was known as the Chiefs a nickname changed in 1998 in reaction to the mounting pressure on schools to adopt names more sensitive to and respectful of Native American culture.

References

External links